William Edward Seager (born April 11, 1952 in Edmonton, Alberta) is a Canadian philosopher. He is a professor of philosophy at the University of Toronto, Scarborough. His academic specialties lie in the philosophy of mind and the philosophy of science.

He received his B.A. in 1973 from the University of Alberta, his M.A. in 1976 from the same university. Seager received his Ph.D. in 1981 from the University of Toronto under the direction of Ronald de Sousa, with a thesis on "Materialism and the Foundations of Representation."

He has been Associate Editor of the Canadian Journal of Philosophy since 2003.

Publications

Books
(With R. McRae, R. Finster, G. Hunter, M. Miles.) The Leibniz Lexicon: A Dual Concordance to Leibniz's Philosophische Schriften, Hildesheim: Olms, 1988. (With R. McRae, R. Finster, G. Hunter, M. Miles.)
Metaphysics of Consciousness, London: Routledge, 1991 . In 323 libraries, according to
Theories of Consciousness, London: Routledge, 1999  In 723 libfraries, according to
The Routledge Handbook of Panpsychism (editor) (2019)

Peer reviewed articles

"A New Idea of Reality: Pauli on the Unity of Mind and Matter" Mind and Matter, Volume 9, Number 1, 2011, pp. 37–52(16)
"Panpsychism, Aggregation and Combinatorial Infusion", Mind and Matter, Volume 8, Number 2, 2010, pp. 167–184(18)
"The Intrinsic Nature Argument for Panpsychism", Journal of Consciousness Studies, Volume 13, Numbers 10-11, 2006, pp. 129–145(17)
"Emergence, Epiphenomenalism and Consciousness" in The Journal of Consciousness Studies, v. 13, no. 1-2, February 2006, pp. 21–38.
"Paradox Lost – Illusion Regained", in Cortex, October 2005, pp. 637–641.
"Tye's Theory of Consciousness: Time to Panic", in Philosophical Studies, 113:3, pp. 237–247 (April 2003).
"Emotional Introspection", in Consciousness and Cognition (December 2002, pp. 666–687).
"Consciousness, Value and Functionalism", in Psyche, vol. 7 (web based journal at http://journalpsyche.org/), September 2001
"The Worm in the Cheese: Leibniz, Consciousness and Matter", in Studia Leibnitiana, 23(1), pp. 79–91, 1991. (Reprinted in Catherine Wilson (ed.) Leibniz a volume in The International Library of Critical Essays in the History of Philosophy, Aldershot: Ashgate, 2001.)
"Introspection and the Elementary Acts of Mind', Dialogue, (Winter 2000) 39, 1, pp. 53-76.
"Real Patterns and Surface Metaphysics" in D. Ross, A. Brook, D. Thompson (eds.) Dennett's Philosophy, MIT Press, 2000, pp. 95–130.
"The Constructed and the Secret Self", in Self-Reference and Self-Awareness, edited by A. Brook and R. Devidi, Amsterdam: J. Benjamins, 2001, pp. 247–268.
"Critical Notice: Fred Dretske, Naturalizing the Mind", in Canadian Journal of Philosophy, 27, 1 (March 1997), pp. 83–110.
"Consciousness, Information and Panpsychism", in the Journal of Consciousness Studies, v. 2, 3, pp. 272–88, 1995. Reprinted in J. Shear (ed.) Explaining Consciousness: The Hard Problem (MIT Press, 1997). Cited by 78 articles, according to Google Scholar
"A Note on the Quantum Eraser", in Philosophy of Science, v. 63, 1, pp. 79–88, 1996.
"Ground Truth and Virtual Reality: Hacking vs. van Fraassen", in Philosophy of Science, 62, pp. 459–78, 1995.
"The Elimination of Experience', in Philosophy and Phenomenological Research, 53, 2, pp. 345-65, June, 1993.
"Fodor's Theory of Content: Problems and Objections', in Philosophy of Science, 60, pp. 262-77, June, 1993.
"Verificationism, Scepticism and Consciousness', in Inquiry, 36, pp. 113-33, March, 1993.
Externalism and Token Identity', in Philosophical Quarterly, 42, pp. 439-48, October, 1992.
"Disjunctive Laws and Supervenience", Analysis, 51, 2, pp. 93–8, March, 1991.
"The Logic of Lost Lingens", Journal of Philosophical Logic, 19, pp. 407–28, 1990.
"Instrumentalism in Psychology", International Studies in the Philosophy of Science, 4, #2, 1990.
"Scientific Explanation and the Trial of Galileo", International Studies in the Philosophy of Science, pp. 176–95, April, 1987.
"Descartes on the Union of Mind and Body", History of Philosophy Quarterly, Vol. 5, No. 2, pp. 119–32, April, 1988.
"Peirce's Teleological Signs", Semiotica, Vol. 69, No. 3-4, 1988.
"Weak Supervenience and Materialism", Philosophy and Phenomenological Research, vol. 48, no. 4, pp. 697–709, June, 1988.
"Credibility, Confirmation and Explanation", British Journal for the Philosophy of Science, pp. 301–17, September, 1987.
"Scientific Anti-realism and the Philosophy of Mind", Pacific Philosophical Quarterly, pp. 136–51, April, 1986.
"A synopsis of 'Credibility, Confirmation and Explanation'," in Dalhousie Review, 1985.
'The Emergence of Consciousness' forthcoming in the Philosophical Exchange. (About 8600 words).
"Is Nuclear Deterrence Paradoxical?", Dialogue, June, 1984.
"Dretske on HOT Theories of Consciousness", in Analysis, v. 54, 4, pp. 270–6, October, 1994.
"Probabilistic Semantics, Identity and Belief", Canadian Journal of Philosophy, pp, 353-64, September 1983.
"Functionalism, Qualia and Causation", Mind, April 1983.
"The Discreet Charm of Counterpart Theory", Analysis, June 1981.
"The Principle of Continuity and the Evaluation of Theories", Dialogue, pp. 485–95, September 1981.
"The Anomalousness of the Mental", The Southern Journal of Philosophy, Volume XIX, Number 3, pp. 389–401, 1981.

Book chapters
'Panpsychism' in Encyclopedia of Cognitive Science wiley, 2010 ,  .
"Dual Aspect Theory", forthcoming entry in the Oxford Companion to Consciousness,
Representationalism about Consciousness' forthcoming article for the Blackwell's Companion to Consciousness.   (co-authored with  David Bourget).
'Panpsychism', forthcoming article for the Cambridge Companion to Consciousness,  .
"A Brief History of the Philosophical Problem of Consciousness",   The Cambridge Handbook of Consciousness, edited by M. Moscovitch and P. Zelazo.
"Emergence and Efficacy", in The Mind as a Scientific Object – Between Brain and Culture, David Johnson and Christina Erneling (eds.) (in Press, with Oxford University Press,)
"Panpsychism" in The Stanford Internet Encyclopaedia of Philosophy,  (2005; substantially updated version of article which first appeared in 2001).
"Whitehead and the Revival (?) of Panpsychism', in Franz Riffert and Michel Weber (eds.) Searching for New Contrasts: Whiteheadian Contributions to Contemporary Challenges in Neurophysiology, Psychology, Psychotherapy and the Philosophy of Mind, New York: Peter Lang, 2004.
"A Cold Look at HOT Theory"', in R. Gennaro (ed.) Higher-Order Theories of Consciousness: An Anthology, Philadelphia: John Benjamins, 2004.
'Panpsychism' in The Macmillan Encyclopaedia of Cognitive Science, 2002.
"Metaphysics, Role in Science", in A Companion to Philosophy of Science (Blackwell Companions to Philosophy), W. H. Newton-Smith (ed.), 1999, pp. 283–92.
"Supervenience and Determination", in A Companion to Philosophy of Science (Blackwell Companions to Philosophy), W. H. Newton-Smith (ed.), 1999, pp. 480–82.
"Leibniz", in A Companion to Philosophy of Science (Blackwell Companions to Philosophy), W. H. Newton-Smith (ed.), 1999, pp. 224–28.
"Physicalism", in A Companion to Philosophy of Science (Blackwell Companions to Philosophy), W. H. Newton-Smith (ed.), 1999, pp. 340–42.
"Conscious Intentionality", in Consciousness and Intentionality, Denis Fisette (ed.), Kluwer, 1999.
'Leibniz and Scientific Realism", in K. Okruhlik and J. R. Brown (eds.) Leibniz: The Philosophy and Foundations of Science, (pp. 315–31), Reidel, 1985.

References

External links
Official web site at University of Toronto

1952 births
Living people
Philosophers of mind
Academic staff of the University of Toronto Scarborough
People from Edmonton
Philosophers of science
21st-century Canadian philosophers